Neil Mixon Ratliff   (b Greenville, Mississippi, 22 Aug 1936; Washington, DC, 17 Sept 1994)., was an American  music librarian, director of the International Piano Archives  at the University of Maryland, College Park.

He was Secretary-General of International Association of Music Libraries, and President of its   United States branch.

Publications
Whistling, Carl Friedrich, Friedrich Hofmeister, and Neil Ratliff. 1975. Handbuch der musikalischen Litteratur ... A reprint of the 1817 edition and the ten supplements,'1818-1827. With a new introduction by Neil Ratliff. New York & London: Garland Pub 
Gottschalk, Louis Moreau, Richard Jackson, Neil Ratliff, and Gilbert Chase. The Little Book of Louis Moreau Gottschalk; Seven Previously Unpublished Piano Pieces. Transcribed and Edited, with an Introd. and Notes, by Richard Jackson and Neil Ratliff. Pref. by Gilbert Chase. With a Complete Facsim. of the Manuscripts. [New York]: New York Public Library, 1976. OCLC 144809310

References

American librarians
1994 deaths
1936 births
Music librarians
New York Public Library people